All Saints College / Coláiste na Naomh Uile is a non-selective, Catholic Maintained, all ability, school for girls and boys aged 11–18 years located in West Belfast, Northern Ireland. It was founded in 2019 following the amalgamation of St Rose's High School, with Christian Brothers School, Glen Road and Corpus Christi College. The college operates from two campuses on the Glen Road (former home to Christian Brothers School or CBS) and in the Beechmount area of Belfast (former home to St Rose's Dominican College) .

History
In 2019, St Rose's High School amalgamated with Christian Brothers School, Glen Road and Corpus Christi College to form this school which took the name All Saints College / Coláiste na Naomh Uile. It is under the trusteeship of the Edmund Rice Schools Trust (NI).

Awards
In 2020 it received the School of Sanctuary award.

References

Secondary schools in Belfast
Catholic secondary schools in Northern Ireland
Educational institutions established in 2019